The first solo flight is when a new airplane  pilot  completes a takeoff, and usually a short flight and safe landing, by themselves.  Flying such a flight is a milestone known as soloing. Being solo pilot of an aircraft is different from most other situations in that the pilot has not only to be able to fly and navigate the machine in a competent manner but they also have to be able to cope with unpredictable developments like mechanical failure, bad weather etc. on their own and without advice from other sources (most air traffic controllers are not pilots and may not be contactable anyway).

Requirements 
Depending on the country, there may be a requirement for some minimum number of training hours to have been completed by the student pilot before they are allowed to solo.  In most countries, it is assumed that such students will be familiar with (and may have to pass an examination on) the relevant air laws or regulations, and will have completed exercises in handling aircraft in normal conditions, and also what to do in the case of engine failure on takeoff, in flight, and before landing.

In the United States, for most aircraft, there is no FAA (Federal Aviation Administration) requirement for a minimum number of hours. Per FAR Part 61 SFAR 73 section 2, Robinson helicopters have a 20-hour requirement to solo. However, the regulations do require that a student pilot show competency in several specific skills to include, for example, the ability to forward slip.  In practice, competence is mostly a judgment call of the Certificated Flight Instructor (CFI) responsible for the student. Typically, it takes from 10 to 30 hours of flight time before a pilot has the instinctive feel of an aircraft to be safe flying solo in other than perfect (no wind) weather.

Soloing 
In some cases, when the student is given permission to fly alone, the instructor directs the student to fly three circuits of the traffic pattern, each accompanied by a full-stop landing.  During the first circuit, the solo, the student's flight instructor may supervise the student's performance from the ground, paying close attention to the approach and landing.  Some instructors keep a radio handy, if there is one in the aircraft, in case the student pilot should need assistance or advice.  When flying a glider the newly approved student may also make more than one tow the first day, though a single solo flight is adequate to earn the "A" badge as a glider pilot.

Traditions 
Several traditions, a kind of rite of passage, have developed in the United States around "soloing", including drenching the student with water and cutting off and permanently displaying the back of their shirt.

In American aviation lore, the traditional removal of a new pilot's shirt tail is a sign of the instructor's new confidence in their student after successful completion of the first solo flight.  In the days of tandem trainers, the student sat in the front seat, with the instructor behind.  As there were often no radios in these early days of aviation, the instructor would tug on the student pilot's shirttail to get their attention, and then yell in their ear.  A successful first solo flight is an indication that the student can fly without the instructor ("instructor-less" flight).  Hence, there is no longer a need for the shirt tail, and it is cut off by the (often) proud instructor, and sometimes displayed as a trophy.

In the British Commonwealth countries, the tradition of soaking the pilot with a bucket or buckets of water after the first solo is very common.

External links
 Langley Flying School "Flying on your own!"
 Phoenix Aviation "What happens on a student's first solo"

References 

Flight training
Rites of passage